This is a list of all teams and players who have won the All-Ireland Under-20 Hurling Championship (previously the All-Ireland Under-21 Championship) since its inception in 1964.

By team

By year

References